"Cross My Mind" was a single released in 2005 by American  R&B/soul singer/songwriter Jill Scott and from her second album, Beautifully Human: Words and Sounds Vol. 2. The song was an R&B top 40 hit peaking to number 38 on the Billboard Hot R&B/Hip-Hop Songs chart. The song earned Scott her first Grammy Award in 2005, for Best Urban/Alternative Performance.

Track listing
US CD" Promo Single

Charts

References

2005 singles
Jill Scott (singer) songs
2004 songs
Songs written by Jill Scott (singer)
Hidden Beach Recordings singles
Contemporary R&B ballads
Soul ballads
2000s ballads
Grammy Award for Best Urban/Alternative Performance